Thalaivaa is a 2013 Indian Tamil-language action thriller film written and directed by A. L. Vijay. It stars Vijay in the title role. The film, produced by Chandraprakash Jain, features background score and soundtrack composed by G. V. Prakash Kumar with cinematography and editing handled by Nirav Shah and Anthony respectively. The story revolves around a dancer who takes over his father's duty as a crime boss after his death. The film also stars with an ensemble supporting cast includes Ragini Nandwani, Amala Paul, Sathyaraj, Santhanam, Abhimanyu Singh and others.

The film, which commenced production in November 2012 in Mumbai, was released on 8 August 2013 on the occasion of Eid-ul Fitr. The film received mostly positive reviews from critics and audience. The film upon its early release was successful at the overseas box office and also successful in Andhra Pradesh, Kerala and Karnataka box office. Due to opposition from the ruling AIADMK as insisted by the then Chief minister J Jayalalithaa, the film had a delayed release in Tamil Nadu on 20 August 2013 and its performance was affected at the Tamil Nadu box office. The film went on to be remade in Punjabi as Sardar Saab in 2017.

Plot
A riot occurs in Mumbai where Ratnam and his son Logu are attacked. However, Ramadurai arrives and saves them. After the riot, Ratnam decides to leave Mumbai and start a new life somewhere else. Ramadurai asks him to stay, but Ratnam says it is best that he moves away. Suddenly that night, Ramadurai's house gets attacked by his opposite gang Bhadra. While trying to save him, Ramadurai's wife Ganga dies on the spot. Enraged, Ramadurai kills Bhadra. He takes his son Vishwa to Ratnam who is in a train and asking him to take Vishwa with him, because he doesn't want Vishwa's life to be wasted by Ramadurai's action and sends him away with Ratnam.

Vishwa is a dancer who lives in Sydney, Australia and also manages a water distribution business in the name of Ganga with his childhood friend Logu and his dance team members.  Ramadurai is a crime boss, who fights for the rights of migrated Tamilians. He keeps in contact with Vishwa as he grows up and lies to him about his profession. Vishwa falls in love with Meera, the daughter of a restaurateur, who is one of his customers. Meera reciprocates Vishwa's feelings and joins his dance team, helping them win a dance competition. She soon proposes to Vishwa, who agrees. Meera's father agrees to the marriage, but wants to discuss the matter formally with Ramadurai. They leave for Mumbai, where Vishwa finds out about Ramadurai's true profession and that he is currently in hiding due to several false charges registered against him by his arch-enemy Bhima, who is Bhadra's son. Vishwa also finds out that Meera and her father are Crime Branch officers, who lured him to Mumbai so that they could arrest Ramadurai. Ramadurai is arrested, but just after he enters the police van, a bomb planted by Bhima in the van explodes, killing him. Vishwa is distraught over his father's death and decides to stay back in Mumbai and take over his father's crime syndicate. He dons the title of Thalaivaa and provides his own brand of justice for the helpless and downtrodden.

Meanwhile, Bhima instigates riots in Mumbai which kill many people and leave several others injured. Vishwa arrives at the scene and saves several others, including a Bhojpuri woman named Gowri, whose marriage was nullified due to the riots. Although there is seemingly lack of evidence that Bhima is responsible, a video recorded by a cameraman Kumar, highlighting Bhima's involvement in the riots is stolen by a Bhojpuri-speaking pickpocket. Vishwa and his gang manage to reclaim the tape from the pickpocket and publicize it, leading to Bhima's arrest. Vishwa also kills the corrupt CM of Maharashtra, who had given Bhima and his gang free rein, and puts the blame on Bhima. However, Bhima soon escapes from prison and kills most of Vishwa's henchmen on the night of Maha Shivaratri including Gowri, with the help of Vishwa's uncle Ranga, who is Vishwa's second-in-command. When Vishwa enters a fort after hearing Ranga is being "held hostage" there by Bhima, he is stabbed by Ranga, who immediately informs the police that Vishwa is "dead" and leaves the fort with his physically handicapped son, who is Vishwa's cousin and driver. Ranga also reveals to have aided Bhima in killing Ramadurai to replace him as leader. When Ranga's son hears about his father's treachery, he becomes enraged and drives the car into a petroleum tanker, killing them both. Meanwhile, Vishwa, though injured fights with Bhima's henchmen and kills them one by one. After a bitter fight, he kills Bhima by stabbing his throat. Meera soon arrives at the fort and realizes that Vishwa killed Bhima, but she acts quickly and shoots the corpses of Bhima and his henchmen to imply that she killed them, thus saving Vishwa from prison term.

Meera eventually quits her job after realizing her love for Vishwa, and marries him. With Bhima and his gang out of the way, Vishwa is now the unchallenged crime boss in Mumbai.

Cast

Production

Casting

After watching A. L. Vijay's period drama film Madrasapattinam (2010), Vijay was impressed by the film and contacted the film director for a new project. A. L. Vijay later narrated the Thalaivaa story to Vijay and he agreed to play the role within 15 minutes. Samantha Ruth Prabhu and Yami Gautam were initially approached for the lead female role. Later Amala Paul with 
TV actress Ragini Nandwani was selected as the main female leads. Vijay Yesudas was reported to be finalized for the antagonist role in this film, but he denied it as rumour. Sathyaraj was also selected to be a part of this film. A. L. Vijay's brother Udhaya has been selected to feature in a prominent role. G. V. Prakash Kumar will be the music director, while Nirav Shah will crank the camera. R. K. Naguraj has been enrolled as art director. Rumors about a Hollywood star portraying a singer, were refuted by Vijay.

Filming
The muhurta of the film was held in Chennai on 16 November 2012. The first schedule began in Mumbai from 23 November 2012. The title song "Thalaivaa Thalaivaa" was shot in Mumbai with 500 junior artists. A major portion of the film was shot in Australia. The first look and title was revealed on 14 January 2013. Additional posters were released on 26 January 2013.

As of 8 February 2013, 50% of total shootings were completed, with stunt scenes conducted by Stunt Silva. Ragini Nandwani, who plays a North Indian, stated that all of her film sequences were shot in Mumbai over 25–30 days. They moved to Chennai and shot a song at Binny Mills. A last shooting schedule in Australia was completed by 24 April. They shot scenes at the Bondi Beach in New South Wales. It was revealed that Vijay would portray a leader of a dance group based in Australia, performing dance styles of different genres including tap dancing with Sathish Krishnan (June Ponal from Unnale Unnale song fame), Karthik (Ungalil yaar Prabhu Deva winner), and their dance schoolmates.

Music

The soundtrack was composed by G. V. Prakash Kumar with lyrics by Na. Muthukumar, both teaming with A. L. Vijay for the fifth time. The soundtrack features five songs and two theme music tracks. As of 21 November 2012, he had composed two songs for the film. One song had been sung by Vijay alongside Santhanam. A third song was completed on 11 February 2013. The audio launch took place on 21 June 2013 in Hotel Connemara. The audio rights of Thalaivaa were bought by Sony Music.

The album received generally positive reviews from critics. Behindwoods rated it 3.5/5, stating "A true for the fans, high on energy and drama".
Oneindia said GV Prakash Kumar has composed the songs keeping new-age audience in mind. Thalaivaa album simply cannot be ignored. Indiaglitz said "Thalaivaa is all about energy and jive. Ranging from foot tapping to soul lifting, the album is elevating in all respects. For a crowd puller like Vijay, this album is aptly scored to be cheery and soulful. In all, GV Prakash has redefined music crafted for dance and rated 3.75 / 5 – Energy packed album. Get up and dance."

Release
Thalaivaa distribution rights for the United States and Canada were bought by Bharat Creations. Ayngaran International acquired the overseas rights for Thalaivaa Tamil Nadu rights were bought by Vendhar Movies and Kerala rights by Thameens via Vendhar Movies. The music rights were sold to Sony Music. Prior to Vijay's birthday on 21 June a theatrical film trailer was released by Sony Music India on their YouTube channel. Trailer got 1.2 million in 32 hours and 2 million views within 2 days on YouTube after its release. The film garnered totally 3.4 million hits on YouTube. The film's running length is 3 hours 2 minutes and was given a "U" certificate by the Indian Censor Board. The film has been released on Friday, 9 August 2013 worldwide.

Reception

Box office
Thalaivaa opened well at international markets, especially in the US and UK. In UK From the paid previews on Thursday till Saturday, Thalaivaa's gross in the UK is  approximate from 34 locations and it is seen as a very impressive opening. Vijay's films generally embark on a great start in the UK, and Thalaivaa is no exception. The film's UK collection is said to be  in its opening weekend. In UK "Thalaivaa" made an impressive start earning  (£1,21,249) from 36 screens in the opening weekend. The film has made higher collections than Suriya's "Singam 2" in the UK. But Vijay's "Thalaivaa" crossed "Singam 2" collections in its debut weekend. The film continued its dream run at the UK box office even in its second weekend.

At the end of the first weekend, the US gross of Thalaivaa from 44 reported locations is US$212,000 . A record total of 70 locations are screening Thalaivaa and the total gross for the first weekend is expected to be in the US$250,000 range Thalaivaa fared well in Malaysia too. Thalaivaa has maintained exceptionally well in its second weekend in Malaysia. The film has become ninth highest grosser of all time in Malaysia's box office in just 10 days collection. In its second weekend the film has collected  (MYR 579,153) on 60 screens and average working out per screens  (MYR 9,654). Baradwaj Rangan of the Hindu wrote "The director gets a lot of things right...this film has been made with some integrity, with respect for the story being told (and, to some extent, the audience too). After Vishwa's transformation, he's rarely shown smiling. Even when Santhanam makes a re-entry, there is no joyous reunion. Even after the heroine is separated from the hero for a while, there are no "dream songs".
"

Critical response 
Oneindia.in stated that the film is a typical entertainer from Vijay, and will make his fans proud to be his fans. IBN Live gave it a 3/5 rating, stating that the film is a full-baked product. Sify stated "Thalaivaa is good and the movie was racy and shorter". Metromasti.com gave the movie 3/5 stars, stating, "Thalaiva which runs for 185 minutes has very intelligent scenes and is expected to be a complete class hit entertainer movie of the year".

'Times of India' gave it a 3/5, stating Vijay is in top form when he's normal and menacing. Sathyaraj as the don is effective. But the one who makes this arduous journey enjoyable is Santhanam, whose poker-faced humour provides relief in a largely grim story. MovieCrow rated it a 3/5, stating that the movie is a typical entertainer. Ananda Vikatan rated the film 42 out of 100. Bookmyshow rated the film 3/5, stating that "Overall, Thalaivaa is a very good movie to watch, not just for movie fanatics down south but all across the nation. If it's the one thing you learn from this flick is – If you're your father's son, you will follow his footsteps!".

Accolades

References

External links
 
 Thalaivaa box office collections

2013 films
Films shot in Mumbai
Films shot in Sydney
2013 action drama films
2013 action thriller films
Indian action drama films
Indian action thriller films
Films directed by A. L. Vijay
Films scored by G. V. Prakash Kumar
2010s Tamil-language films
Films set in Mumbai
Films set in Sydney
Films shot in Chennai
Tamil films remade in other languages